Revolution 96.2 was an Independent Local Radio station serving the Oldham, Rochdale and Tameside areas of Greater Manchester.

Following its sale to Bauer Radio, the station was closed and merged with the Greatest Hits Radio network in November 2020.

History
Oldham FM Limited was incorporated on 5 June 1997 - Bernard Stone, Philip Hirst and Christopher Hirst of Hirst Kidd and Rennie Ltd., owners of local newspaper Oldham Evening Chronicle, were appointed company directors. The following December, David Bruce and Stephen Kitney of UK Radio Developments LTD, as well as Nichola Atkinson, John Gracie and Liam Forristal were also added as company directors.

The new owners launched a bid for a full-time broadcasting licence, while using temporary RSL licences, broadcasting for one month per year. After two years, a licence was granted. On 30 August 1999, Oldham FM began broadcasting under the name 96.2 The Revolution. The name was chosen because of the Industrial Revolution, in which the region took a major role, and the initial letters of its three main target areas – Revolution. 

The Revolution initially ran a mainstream pop and rock music format, but in 2005, the station's playlist changed to a specialist mix of new and classic alternative, soul & rock and roll music, spanning the last 40 years. Inspiral Carpets keyboard player Clint Boon briefly took over as its head of music, before leaving to join rival station XFM Manchester.

Following a big fall in listening figures, The Revolution was put up for sale in 2008, and its music format reverted to heavily rotated mainstream pop and rock - a change reportedly imposed by the station's owner during an afternoon in late August 2008. Most of the station's presenters walked out, resulting in long periods of non-stop automated music.

A fortnight after the walkout, it was announced that The Revolution had been purchased by former Key 103 and Capital FM presenter Steve Penk, who reverted the format change and took over the station's breakfast show.

In January 2014, Penk sold the radio station to Credible Media, which sought to create stronger links with local businesses and institutions in the target service area.

On 30 August 2015, Niocast Digital began a trial of broadcasting six radio stations on small-scale DAB multiplex 10B in Greater Manchester, including The Revolution.

On 23 October 2020, it was announced Bauer had brought the station. Revolution 96.2 ceased broadcasting on 16 November 2020 and was replaced by Greatest Hits Radio North West.

Audience

Notable presenters
 
 James H. Reeve
 Pat Sharp
 Donny Osmond
 Gary Mounfield
 Martin Coogan
 Steve Penk
 Clint Boon

References

External links
 Media UK directory entry

Mass media in the Metropolitan Borough of Oldham
Radio stations in Manchester
Radio stations established in 1999
1999 establishments in England
Defunct radio stations in the United Kingdom
2020 disestablishments in England
Radio stations disestablished in 2020